John Curtis "Jack" Chapman (May 8, 1843 – June 10, 1916) was an American Major League Baseball player and manager who was born in Brooklyn, New York. He began playing in the National Association when he played for the  Brooklyn Atlantics and the  St. Louis Brown Stockings. In , when the National League formed, he became the player-manager for the Louisville Grays. The following season saw him staying with Louisville in the manager role only. After the  season, the Louisville team was expelled from the National League, and Chapman became manager of the Milwaukee Grays. The team had a poor record, and he was fired. 

Chapman took part in the pre-modern era World Series by managing his team in the 1890 World Series, the seventh of eight held prior to the first modern Series in 1903. The team faced the Brooklyn Bridegrooms of the National League that would be held as a best-of-seven series. Brooklyn won the first two games before the third game ended in an eight inning tie. Louisville won two out of the next three to force a seventh game amidst worsening weather conditions. Chapman and Brooklyn manager Bill McGunnigle agreed that the October 28 game would be the last one held, although it was stated that if Louisville won the game and tied the series that they would meet again in the following spring to determine the true winner. Louisville won 6-2, but the agreement between the AA and the NL floundered in the winter, meaning that no true winner of the 1890 Series was awarded that year.

Chapman's nickname was "Death to Flying Things", although fellow major leaguer Bob Ferguson had also been given the nickname. Chapman died in Brooklyn at the age of 73, and he is interred at Green-Wood Cemetery.

See also
List of Major League Baseball player-managers

References

External links

Career managerial record Baseball-Reference.com

1843 births
1916 deaths
19th-century baseball players
Major League Baseball player-managers
Major League Baseball right fielders
Brooklyn Enterprise players
Brooklyn Atlantics (NABBP) players
Brooklyn Atlantics players
St. Louis Brown Stockings (NA) players
Louisville Grays players
Louisville Grays managers
Milwaukee Grays managers
Worcester Worcesters managers
Detroit Wolverines managers
Buffalo Bisons (NL) managers
Louisville Colonels managers
Baseball coaches from New York (state)
Sportspeople from Brooklyn
Baseball players from New York City
Burials at Green-Wood Cemetery